Longan wine is a Southeast Asian fermented drink made of the fruit of Dimocarpus longan, more commonly called longan or dark-skinned dragon's eye. While originating in China, it has also become a speciality in a number of locations in Southeast Asia such as the province of Bac Lieu.

History 
The longan fruit has long been grown and produced as wine along the Great Wall of China especially in the provinces of Xinjiang, Gansu, Shanxi and Hebei. It gained popularity in the later half of the 20th century. Thus, the white wine of dried longan from China's Greatwall Wine Co. was a silver medal winner at the 14th International Wine-Tasting Meeting in London in 1983. Since then, production of longan wine has spread to Southeast Asia. Thus, since 2015, it has been developed commercially on a small-scale in Thailand and in Cambodia.

Preparation 
Longan liqueur is made by macerating the longan flesh in alcohol.

In Southeast Asia, particularly in Northern Thailand, longan fruit is overabundant when in season and therefore it is dried and processed into various products, among which longan wine. This research was thus aimed to develop the high antioxidant wine from dried longan seed. 

Fermentation temperature is suggested at 30°C due to the shorter time of production.

Health 
Longan wine is much sweeter than other varieties and could therefore be discouraged in the case of diabetes. However, longan seed is a great source of Antioxidants and it is naturally extracted during fermentation. As a traditional drink, it is even recommended for men's health by Government of Bac Lieu province in Vietnam.

References 

Fermented drinks
Tropical agriculture
Cambodian alcoholic drinks
Malaysian alcoholic drinks
Non-timber forest products
 
Drinking culture